was a Japanese politician from the Social Democratic Party (SPD) and then from Democratic Party of Japan. He served as deputy prime minister and finance minister of Japan from 5 January 1996 to 7 November 1996.

Early life and education
Kubo was born in Kagoshima Prefecture on 15 January 1929. He finished Kagoshima Normal School (currently Kagoshima University) and entered Department of Western History, Hiroshima University of Literature and Science (currently Hiroshima University). He received a bachelor's degree from Hiroshima University of Literature and Science in 1952.

Career

Kubo started his career as a high-school teacher. Then he involved in politics, and in 1963, he was elected to the Kagoshima Prefectural Assembly where he served for three terms. He was first elected to the upper house in July 1974 from Kagoshima at-large district. Until 1993 he served as chairman and a member of different committees at the house, including the budget and finance committee in the upper house. In September 1993, he was named as secretary general of the Social Democratic Party during the term of the party chief Tomiichi Murayama. He was also chief finance policy strategist and deputy chairman of the party.

He served as vice prime minister and finance minister from 5 January to 7 November 1996 in the first cabinet of Prime Minister Ryutaro Hashimoto that was a coalition of the Liberal Democratic Party, the SDP and New Party Sakigake. Kubo's term ended when Hashimoto inaugurated his second cabinet and the coalition parties SPD and New Party Sakigake remained outside the government. Kubo was succeeded by Hiroshi Mitsuzuka as finance minister.

Kubo left the SPD on 6 January 1997 due to the disagreements with the SPD chief Takako Doi. After his resignation, Kubo joined the Democratic Party of Japan (DPJ). Then he became a member of the upper house with the DPJ. He retired from politics as a member of the DPJ in June 2001 after serving four terms at the upper house, being a representative of Kagoshima Prefecture.

Personal life
Kubo had a high rank in kendo. He received the Grand Cordon of the Order of the Rising Sun, Japan's top award for contributions to the state and society, in November 2001.

Death
Kubo died at a hospital in Kagoshima on 24 June 2003. He was 74.

References

External links

20th-century Japanese politicians
1929 births
2003 deaths
Deputy Prime Ministers of Japan
Government ministers of Japan
Ministers of Finance of Japan
Members of the House of Councillors (Japan)
Democratic Party of Japan politicians
Social Democratic Party (Japan) politicians
Politicians from Kagoshima Prefecture
Recipients of the Order of the Rising Sun
Hiroshima University alumni
Kagoshima University alumni
People from Kagoshima Prefecture